Albina Andrianovna Borisova (born 12 June 1952) is a Yakut writer and translator working in Yakut and Russian.

Borisova was born in Yakutsk, and graduated from high school in 1969, whereupon she took a job at the Yakut State Drama Theater. In school she wrote Russian-language poetry, and some of her poetry appeared in a children's newspaper. As part of the requirements for her theatrical post she translated plays by Yakut writers. In 1979 she graduated with a diploma in translation from the Maxim Gorky Literature Institute. She then returned to the Yakut Autonomous Soviet Socialist Republic, taking a post as editor and assistant director of the State Television and Radio Broadcasting Academy and later becoming executive secretary of the Yakut branch of the All-Russian Theater Society. She worked as a simultaneous translator and announcer for the state theater, with which group she traveled extensively throughout the Soviet Union; she eventually translated almost the entire repertory of the theater into Russian. From 1987 until 193 she was an editor for the children's magazine Chuoraanchyk. Since 1995 she has worked at the Bichik National Publishing House as chief editor and later as deputy director. From 2001 until 2013 she worked for the press service for the Sakha Republic state assembly.

References

1952 births
Living people
Yakut people
Translators to Russian
20th-century Russian translators
20th-century Russian women writers
21st-century translators
21st-century Russian women writers
People from Yakutsk
Maxim Gorky Literature Institute alumni